Stapleton is a city in Jefferson County, Georgia, United States. The population was 438 at the 2010 census, up from 318 at the 2000 census.

History
An early variant name was "Spread". The Georgia General Assembly incorporated the place as the "Town of Spread" in 1903. Stapleton derives its current name from Colonel James Stapleton.

Geography 

Stapleton is located in northwestern Jefferson County at  (33.215877, -82.468007). Georgia State Route 102 passes through the center of town as Main Street, leading east  to Wrens and west  to Avera. State Route 296 (Harvey Street and George Street) crosses SR-102 in the center of Stapleton, leading northeast  to SR-17 in Warren County and south  to Louisville, the Jefferson county seat.

Demographics 

As of the census of 2000, there were 318 people, 110 households, and 80 families residing in the city. The racial makeup of the city was 70.13% White, 28.62% African American, and 1.26% from two or more races.

There were 110 households, out of which 44.5% had children under the age of 18 living with them, 50.9% were married couples living together, 18.2% had a female householder with no husband present, and 26.4% were non-families. 23.6% of all households were made up of individuals, and 6.4% had someone living alone who was 65 years of age or older.  The average household size was 2.78 and the average family size was 3.28.

In the city, the population was spread out, with 30.8% under the age of 18, 5.7% from 18 to 24, 27.4% from 25 to 44, 25.2% from 45 to 64, and 11.0% who were 65 years of age or older.  The median age was 34 years. For every 100 females, there were 102.5 males.  For every 100 females age 18 and over, there were 84.9 males.

The median income for a household in the city was $35,288, and the median income for a family was $37,083. Males had a median income of $35,208 versus $17,500 for females. The per capita income for the city was $15,829.  About 17.1% of families and 20.4% of the population were below the poverty line, including 26.2% of those under age 18 and 33.3% of those age 65 or over.

See also 

Central Savannah River Area

References

External links 
 The News and Farmer and Wadley Herald/ Jefferson Reporter, the county's weekly newspaper and the oldest weekly newspaper in Georgia.

Cities in Georgia (U.S. state)
Cities in Jefferson County, Georgia